Hartland Township is a township in Worth County, Iowa, United States.

History
Hartland Township was established in 1859.

References

Townships in Worth County, Iowa
Townships in Iowa